Blood and Sand is a 1989 Spanish drama film directed by Javier Elorrieta and starring Christopher Rydell, Sharon Stone, and Ana Torrent. It was loosely based on the novel Sangre y arena of Vicente Blasco Ibáñez, which had been adapted for the screen three times before, in 1916, 1922 and 1941.

Plot
The story revolves around the young and talented natural gifted Torero Juan Gallardo (Christopher Rydell). Juan wants to be popular in bullfighting. One night, Juan takes the cousin of his love Carmen (Ana Torrent) with him for a bullfighting competition. They successfully earn some level and skills in the arena, but something goes wrong. As the bull charges at Juan, his friend saves Gallardo at the cost of his own life.

Juan then leaves, and meets a beautiful rich woman named Doña Sol (Sharon Stone), the daughter of a wealthy landowner. Lady Doña Sol offers Juan an opportunity to join her company as a worker of her fields and lands, but Juan insists on becoming a superstar as a bullfighter in his country. As Juan leaves her home, a security guard tells him to join the bullfighting trainer Nacional (Albert Vidal). Nacional trains Juan until he is able to join the national bullfighting competition. Another one of Juan's friends named Garabato (Guillermo Montesinos) also joins him. Juan displays brilliant skills in his first appearance of national league and his popularity rises.

Juan then marries Carmen, and his popularity increases weeks after weeks. Juan soon develops a crush on Lady Doña Sol, which starts a dramatic twist in the movie. As time passes, Juan falls deeply in love with Lady Doña Sol and offers to marry her, but Lady Doña Sol isn't interested in marrying him. Carmen finally visits Lady Doña Sol to talk about Juan, but instead, Lady Doña Sol shows where Juan is hiding.

That night, Juan goes to a midnight bar. Against the advice of Nacional, Juan gets drunk and hangs out with some bar girls. Nacional advises Juan to focus on the competition for the next day. In response, Juan kicks Nacional and asks him to leave; an angry Nacional complies and storms out of the bar.

Juan and Lady Doña Sol go to a popular city hotel, where Juan's rival, Pepe Serrano, is present. Juan angrily punches Serrano after he tries to make a move on Lady Doña Sol, but Serrano takes her anyway.

The next day, Juan drunkenly goes to the office of his manager Don Jose, accompanied by two girls. Nacional admonishes Juan again, and in response, Juan slaps him hard; Nacional gives up on teaching Juan.

To make amends for cheating on Carmen, Juan calls Carmen and apologizes, but Carmen does not forgive him.

The next day, the bullfight commences; Juan begins failing to control the bull. At the same time, Carmen and Juan's mother pray for him, while Juan's brother-in-law Antonio advises Carmen to go help Juan and forgive him.

As Carmen enters the stands, Nacional sees her and runs to Juan, telling him that Carmen has come to watch him. Before Juan begins the competition, he throws his cap to Carmen as an apology. Juan gives an outstanding performance, but in the final move, where he is about to kill the bull with his sword, the bull suddenly charges towards Juan, goring him in the stomach. The bull then throws him to the ground several times. Paramedics arrive and immediately take Juan to the emergency trauma room. Concerned for Juan, Carmen and Nacional follow them; Juan dies from the trauma and blood loss, and Carmen and Nacional walk away weeping.

Back in the arena, Serrano defeats the bull, winning the competition, and he is escorted out of the arena.

Cast 

Christopher Rydell as Juan Gallardo
Ana Torrent as Carmen
Sharon Stone as Lady Doña Sol
Albert Vidal as Nacional
Tony Fuentes as Pepe Serrano
Guillermo Montesinos as Garabato
Simón Andreu as Antonio
José Luis de Vilallonga as Don José

See also 
 Blood and Sand (1916 film)
 Blood and Sand (1922 film)
 Blood and Sand (1941 film)

External links 
 
 

Films based on Spanish novels
1989 films
1989 crime drama films
Films based on works by Vicente Blasco Ibáñez
Spanish drama films
Films with screenplays by Rafael Azcona
English-language Spanish films
1980s English-language films